Jararaca may refer to:

 Bothrops jararaca, a venomous pit viper found in South America
 Bothrops neuwiedi, known as jararaca pintada, a venomous pit viper found in South America
 Jararaca (actor), a Brazilian actor
 EE-3 Jararaca, a Brazilian 4x4 armored vehicle

Animal common name disambiguation pages